Charles Greco may refer to:

 Charles Pasquale Greco (1894–1987), American prelate of the Roman Catholic Church
 Charles R. Greco (1873–1963), American architect